Maria Lantz is a Swedish artist working in the fields of photography, text and collaborative art projects. She is Associate Professor and Vice-Chancellor at Konstfack, the University College of Arts, Crafts and Design in Stockholm. She writes critique and reviews for Dagens Nyheter and the Swedish Radio.

Life
Lantz was born in 1962.

Maria Lantz has exhibited in major venues in Europe including Umeå Bildmuseum (2009), Botkyrka Konsthall (2008), BB3, Bucharest Biennale, Bucharest Romania (2008), Liljevalchs konsthall, Stockholm (2007) and the Townhouse Gallery in Cairo, Egypt. She was the co-editor of the book Dharavi: Documenting Informalities.

References 

http://www.tidningenmotiv.se/
http://www.dn.se/dnbok/andra-sidor-av-slummen-1.798519
http://www.dn.se/kultur-noje/konstrecensioner/robert-adams-2009-ars-hasselbladspristagare-pahasselblad-center-goteborgs-konstmuseum-visas-1.1006917
http://www.dn.se/kultur-noje/debatt-essa/fri-konst-ger-mening-1.468411
http://www.dn.se/dnbok/ett-galleri-pa-papper-1.419345

1962 births
Swedish photographers
Artists from Stockholm
Living people